Thrash metal (or simply thrash) is an extreme subgenre of heavy metal music characterized by its overall aggression and often fast tempo. The songs usually use fast percussive beats and low-register guitar riffs, overlaid with shredding-style lead guitar work. The lyrical subject matter often includes criticism of The Establishment and concern over environmental destruction, and at times shares a disdain for Christian dogma with that of black metal. The language is typically direct and denunciatory, an approach borrowed from hardcore punk.

The genre emerged in the early 1980s as musicians began fusing the double bass drumming and complex guitar stylings of the new wave of British heavy metal (NWOBHM) with the speed and aggression of hardcore punk. Philosophically, thrash metal developed as a backlash against both the conservatism of the Reagan Era and the much more moderate, pop-influenced, and widely accessible heavy metal subgenre of glam metal which also developed concurrently in the 1980s.

The early thrash metal movement revolved around independent record labels, including Megaforce, Metal Blade, Combat, Roadrunner, and Noise, and the underground tape trading industry in both Europe and North America. The genre was commercially successful during the mid-to-late 1980s and early 1990s, with the "Big Four" of thrash metal – Metallica, Slayer, Megadeth, and Anthrax – being joined by Exodus, Overkill, Testament, and Sepultura, as well as the "Big Four" of German thrash metal: Kreator, Destruction, Sodom, and Tankard. Some of those bands are often credited for helping create, develop and popularize the genre.

The thrash metal genre had declined in popularity by the mid-1990s, with the commercial success of numerous genres such as alternative rock, grunge, and later nu metal. During that period, some bands either disbanded or moved away from their thrash metal roots and more towards groove metal or alternative metal. During the 2000s and 2010s, thrash metal experienced a resurgence in popularity, with the arrival of various modern acts such as Bonded by Blood, Evile, Hatchet, Havok, Municipal Waste, and Warbringer, who have all been credited for leading the so-called "thrash metal revival" scene.

Characteristics 

Thrash metal generally features fast tempos, low-register, complex guitar riffs, high-register guitar solos, and double bass drumming. The rhythm guitar parts are played with heavy distortion and often palm muted to create a tighter and more precise sound. Vocally, thrash metal can employ anything from melodic singing to shouted or screamed vocals. Most guitar solos are played at high speed and technically demanding, as they are usually characterized by shredding, and use advanced techniques such as sweep picking, legato phrasing, alternate picking, tremolo picking, string skipping, and two-hand tapping. 

David Ellefson, bassist for one of the biggest thrash bands, Megadeth, described thrash metal as "a combination of the attitude from punk rock but the riffs and complexities of traditional metal."

The guitar riffs often use chromatic scales and emphasize the tritone and diminished intervals, instead of using conventional single-scale-based riffing. For example, the intro riff of Metallica's "Master of Puppets" (the title track of the namesake album) is a chromatic descent, followed by a chromatic ascent based on the tritone.

Speed, pacing, and time changes also define thrash metal. Thrash tends to have an accelerating feel which may be due in large part to its aggressive drumming style. For example, drummers often use two bass drums, or a double-bass pedal to create a relentless, driving beat. Cymbal stops/chokes are often used to transition from one riff to another or to precede an acceleration in tempo. Some common characteristics of the genre are fast guitar riffs with aggressive picking styles and fast guitar solos, and extensive use of two bass drums as opposed to the conventional use of only one, typical of most rock music.

To keep up with the other instruments, many bassists use a plectrum. However, some prominent thrash metal bassists have used their fingers, such as Frank Bello, Greg Christian, Steve Di Giorgio, Robert Trujillo, and Cliff Burton. Several bassists use a distorted bass tone, an approach popularized by Burton and Motörhead's Lemmy. Lyrical themes in thrash metal include warfare, corruption, injustice, murder, suicide, isolation, alienation, addiction, and other maladies that afflict the individual and society. In addition, politics, particularly pessimism and dissatisfaction towards politics, are common themes among thrash metal bands. Humor and irony can occasionally be found (Anthrax for example), but they are limited, and are an exception rather than a rule.

History

Origins 

Among the earliest songs credited with influencing future thrash musicians was Queen's "Stone Cold Crazy", recorded and released in 1974. The song was described as being thrash metal "before the term had been invented". Black Sabbath's "Symptom of the Universe", released in 1975, is often referred to as a compelling early influence on thrash, and was a direct inspiration for Diamond Head's pioneering song "Am I Evil?". The NWOBHM bands emerging from Britain in the late 1970s further influenced the development of early thrash. The early work of artists such as Diamond Head, Iron Maiden, Venom, Motörhead, Tygers of Pan Tang, Raven, and Angel Witch, among others, introduced the fast-paced and intricate musicianship that became core aspects of thrash. Phil Taylor's double-bass drumming featured in Motörhead's 1979 song "Overkill" has been acknowledged by many thrash drummers, most notably Lars Ulrich, as a primary influence on their playing. Metal Blade Records executive Brian Slagel played a key role in bringing the emerging genre to a larger audience, as he was responsible for discovering both Metallica and Slayer and producing their earliest studio recordings.

Void is hailed as one of the earliest examples of hardcore/heavy metal crossover, whose chaotic musical approach is often cited as particularly influential. Their 1982 split LP with fellow Washington band The Faith showed both bands exhibiting quick, fiery, high-speed punk rock. It has been argued that those recordings laid the foundation for early thrash metal, at least in terms of selected tempos.

In Latin America, this genre also gained a lot of strength, and its creation is also attributed to it, since it began to gain popularity due to the dictatorships that many countries faced at that time, with bands like V8 (1979) with their debut albums Demo 1982 or Luchando por el metal, and Bloke (1980) from Argentina, Transmetal (1987) from México, also the band Massakre (1985) in Chile.

In Europe, the earliest band of the emerging thrash movement was Venom from Newcastle upon Tyne, formed in 1979. Their 1982 album Black Metal has been cited as a major influence on many subsequent genres and bands in the extreme metal world, such as Bathory, Hellhammer, Slayer, and Mayhem. The European scene was almost exclusively influenced by the most aggressive music Germany and England were producing at the time. British bands such as Tank and Raven, along with German bands Accept (whose 1982 song "Fast as a Shark" is often credited as one of the first-ever thrash/speed metal songs) and Living Death, motivated musicians from central Europe to start bands of their own, eventually producing groups such as Sodom, Kreator, and Destruction from Germany, as well as Switzerland's Celtic Frost (formed by two-thirds of Hellhammer), Coroner and Carrion (who later became Poltergeist).

Early 1980s
In 1981, Los Angeles band Leather Charm wrote a song entitled "Hit the Lights". Leather Charm soon disbanded and the band's primary songwriter, vocalist/rhythm guitarist James Hetfield, met drummer Lars Ulrich through a classified advertisement. Together, Hetfield and Ulrich formed Metallica, one of the "Big Four" thrash bands, with lead guitarist Dave Mustaine, who would later form Megadeth, another of the "Big Four" originators of thrash, and bassist Ron McGovney. McGovney would be replaced by Cliff Burton (formerly of Trauma), and Mustaine was later replaced by Kirk Hammett of the then-unsigned Bay Area thrash metal act Exodus, and at Burton's insistence, the band relocated to the San Francisco Bay Area. Before Metallica had even settled on a definitive lineup, Metal Blade Records executive Brian Slagel asked Hetfield and Ulrich (credited as "Mettallica") to record "Hit the Lights" for the first edition of his Metal Massacre compilation in 1982. An updated version of "Hit the Lights" would later open their first studio album, Kill 'Em All, released in mid-1983.

The term "thrash metal" was first used in the music press by Kerrang! magazine's journalist Malcolm Dome while referring to another of the "Big Four", Anthrax (who, like Metallica, formed in 1981), and their song "Metal Thrashing Mad". Before this, Metallica frontman James Hetfield referred to his band's sound as speed metal or power metal.

Another "Big Four" thrash band formed in Los Angeles in 1981, when guitarists Jeff Hanneman and Kerry King met while auditioning for the same band and subsequently decided to form a band of their own. Hanneman and King recruited vocalist/bassist Tom Araya and drummer Dave Lombardo, and Slayer was formed. Slayer was discovered by Metal Blade Records executive Brian Slagel; the band's live performance of Iron Maiden's "Phantom of the Opera" so impressed him that he promptly signed them to his label. In December 1983, four months after the release of Metallica's debut Kill 'Em All, Slayer released their debut album, Show No Mercy.

To the north, Canada produced influential thrash and speed metal bands such as Annihilator, Anvil, Exciter, Razor, Sacrifice, and Voivod.

Mid-1980s

The popularity of thrash metal increased in 1984 with the release of Metallica's sophomore record Ride the Lightning, as well as Anthrax's debut Fistful of Metal. Slayer and Overkill released extended plays on independent labels during this era, Haunting the Chapel and Overkill respectively. This led to a heavier-sounding form of thrash, which was reflected in Exodus' Bonded by Blood and Slayer's Hell Awaits. In 1985, the German band Kreator released their debut album Endless Pain and the Brazilian band Sepultura released their EP Bestial Devastation. Overkill and Megadeth, the latter of which was formed by former Metallica guitarist Dave Mustaine, released their debut albums Feel the Fire and Killing Is My Business... and Business Is Good! respectively, and Anthrax released the critically acclaimed Spreading the Disease in 1985. Several other debut albums associated with the thrash metal genre were released that year, including Seven Churches by Possessed, To Mega Therion by Celtic Frost, and Energetic Disassembly by Watchtower; the first two are often credited for pioneering and popularizing the mid-1980s extreme metal scene (as well as the then-developing genres of death metal and black metal, respectively), while the latter has been cited as the first progressive/technical thrash metal album.

From a creative standpoint, the year 1986 was perhaps the pinnacle of thrash metal, as a number of critically acclaimed and genre-defining albums were released. Metallica's major label debut Master of Puppets was released in March, becoming the first thrash album to be certified platinum, being certified 6× platinum by the Recording Industry Association of America (RIAA); it would be the band's last album to feature bassist Cliff Burton, who was killed in a bus accident six months after its release. Kreator released Pleasure to Kill in April 1986, which would later be a major influence on the death metal scene. Megadeth released Peace Sells... but Who's Buying? in September, an album which proved to be the band's commercial and critical breakthrough and which AllMusic later cited as "a classic of early thrash". Slayer, regarded as one of the most sinister thrash metal bands of the early 1980s, released Reign in Blood in October, an album considered by some to have single-handedly inspired the death metal genre. Also in October, Nuclear Assault released their debut album Game Over, followed a month later by Dark Angel's Darkness Descends, which marked the debut of renowned drummer Gene Hoglan. Flotsam and Jetsam's debut album Doomsday for the Deceiver (released on the Fourth of July in 1986) received some attention as well, due to the album being "the first of only a handful" to ever receive a 6K rating from Kerrang! magazine, and it is also notable for featuring a then-unknown Jason Newsted, who, not long after the album's release, joined Metallica as Burton's replacement.

Also during the mid-to-late 1980s, bands such as Suicidal Tendencies, D.R.I., S.O.D. (who featured three-fifths of Anthrax), and Corrosion of Conformity paved the way to what became known as crossover thrash, a fusion genre that lies on a continuum between heavy metal and hardcore punk, and is arguably faster and more aggressive than thrash metal.

Late 1980s

In 1987, Anthrax released their third album Among the Living, which borrowed elements from their two previous releases, with fast guitar riffs and pounding drums. Death Angel took a similar approach with their 1987 debut, The Ultra-Violence. Suicidal Tendencies, who were originally a hardcore punk band and are often considered to be one of the "fathers of crossover thrash", became more recognized as a thrash metal band in the late 1980s (thanks in large part to the presence of guitarists Rocky George and Mike Clark), and the band would reach new heights of success with their first two major-label albums, How Will I Laugh Tomorrow When I Can't Even Smile Today (1988) and Controlled by Hatred/Feel Like Shit... Déjà Vu (1989). D.R.I., also a pioneering crossover thrash band, garnered considerable attention with the more thrash-oriented albums, Crossover (1987), 4 of a Kind (1988), and Thrash Zone (1989).

Sepultura's third album, Beneath the Remains (1989), earned them some mainstream appeal as it was released by Roadrunner Records. Testament released three albums in the late 1980s, The Legacy, The New Order, and Practice What You Preach, all showing the band's musical growth and gaining Testament nearly the same level of popularity as the "Big Four", while Exodus' third album Fabulous Disaster (1989) garnered the band their first music video and one of their most recognized songs, the mosh-pit anthem "The Toxic Waltz". Vio-lence, Forbidden, and Sadus, three relative latecomers to the Bay Area thrash metal scene, released their debut albums Eternal Nightmare, Forbidden Evil, and Illusions, respectively, in 1988; the latter album demonstrated a sound that was primarily driven by the fretless bass of Steve Di Giorgio.

Canadian thrashers Annihilator released their highly technical debut Alice in Hell in 1989, which was praised for its fast riffs and extended guitar solos. In Germany, Sodom released Agent Orange, and Kreator would release Extreme Aggression. Several highly acclaimed albums associated with the sub-genre of technical thrash metal were also released in 1989, including Coroner's No More Color, Dark Angel's Leave Scars, Toxik's Think This, and Watchtower's Control and Resistance, which has been recognized and acknowledged as one of the cornerstones of jazz-metal fusion and a major influence on the technical death metal genre, while Forced Entry's debut album Uncertain Future helped pioneer the late 1980s Seattle music scene.

From 1987 to 1989, Overkill released Taking Over, Under the Influence, and The Years of Decay, three albums considered their best. Each of the "Big Four" of thrash metal bands released albums in 1988: Slayer released South of Heaven, Megadeth released So Far, So Good... So What!, Anthrax released State of Euphoria while Metallica's ...And Justice for All spawned the band's first video and Top 40 hit, the World War I–themed song "One".

Many thrash metal bands benefited from the exposure they received on MTV's Headbangers Ball, radio stations such as KNAC in Long Beach and Z Rock in Dallas, and coverage on numerous publications, including Kerrang! and RIP Magazine. These outlets not only played a major role in the crossover success of thrash metal during the late 1980s, but helped push album sales of the genre's "Big Four" and similar bands, or moved them from playing clubs to arenas and stadiums. One of the most notable events in thrash metal's growing popularity during this period was the summer of 1988 Monsters of Rock tour in North America (co-headlined by Van Halen and Scorpions), at which Metallica was one of the supporting acts and drew the largest audiences of the two-month-long arena and stadium tour. In the following year, Anthrax teamed up with Exodus and Helloween on a US arena tour sponsored by Headbangers Ball.

1990s

A number of more typical but technically sophisticated albums were released in 1990, including Megadeth's Rust in Peace, Anthrax's Persistence of Time, Slayer's Seasons in the Abyss, Suicidal Tendencies' Lights...Camera...Revolution!, Testament's Souls of Black, Kreator's Coma of Souls, Destruction's Cracked Brain, Forbidden's Twisted into Form, Exodus' Impact Is Imminent, Sacred Reich's The American Way, Prong's Beg to Differ, Pantera's Cowboys from Hell and Exhorder's Slaughter in the Vatican; the latter three are often credited for being an integral part of the then-developing groove metal genre. All of those albums were commercial high points for the aforementioned artists. During this period, Megadeth and Slayer co-headlined one of the most successful tours in thrash metal history called the Clash of the Titans; the first leg in Europe included support from Testament and Suicidal Tendencies, while the second leg in the US had Anthrax and then-emerging Seattle band Alice in Chains, who were the supporting act.

Several albums, some of which had come to be known as technical thrash metal, were released in 1991, including Overkill's Horrorscope, Heathen's Victims of Deception, Dark Angel's Time Does Not Heal, Sepultura's Arise, Coroner's Mental Vortex, Prong's Prove You Wrong and Forced Entry's As Above, So Below.

In 1991, Metallica released their eponymous album, known as "The Black Album". The album marked a stylistic change in the band, eliminating much of the speed and longer song structures of the band's previous work, and instead focusing on more concise and heavier songs. The album was a change in Metallica's direction from the thrash metal style of the band's previous four studio albums towards a more contemporary heavy metal sound with original hard rock elements, but still had remnant characteristics of thrash metal. It would go on to become the band's best-selling album and began a wave of thrash metal bands releasing more garage-oriented albums, or else more experimental ones.

The era of 1991–1992 marked the beginning of the end of thrash metal's commercial peak, due to the rising popularity of the alternative metal and grunge movements. In response to this climate change, many thrash metal bands that had emerged from the previous decade had called it quits or went on hiatus during the 1990s, while half of the "Big Four" and other veteran bands began changing to more accessible, radio-friendly styles. Metallica was a notable example of this shift, particularly with their mid–to–late 1990s albums Load, and ReLoad, which displayed minor blues and southern rock influences, and were seen as a major departure from the band's earlier sound. Megadeth took a more accessible heavy metal route starting with their 1992 album Countdown to Extinction. Testament, Exodus and Flotsam and Jetsam all took a melodic/progressive approach with the albums The Ritual, Force of Habit, and Cuatro, respectively. One of the pioneers of crossover thrash, Corrosion of Conformity, began changing their sound into a slower and Black Sabbath-influenced heavy metal direction with their post-1980s output, adapting influences and textures of sludge, doom metal, blues, and southern rock on several of their albums, including Blind (1991), Deliverance (1994) and Wiseblood (1996).

In the wake of the success of groove metal, instigated by Pantera (who went on to become one of the most successful heavy metal bands of the 1990s), several thrash metal established bands started to expand their sound by adding elements and influences from the groove metal genre. Anthrax, who had recently replaced Joey Belladonna with John Bush as their singer, began stepping away from their previously established thrash metal formula to a more accessible alternative/groove metal approach for the remainder of their 1990s output, starting with and including Sound of White Noise (1993). Sacred Reich, Overkill, Coroner, Prong, Testament, and Forbidden followed this trend with their respective albums Independent, I Hear Black, Grin, Cleansing, Low, and Distortion. Sepultura's 1993 album Chaos A.D. also marked the beginning of their transition away from death/thrash metal to groove metal which had influenced then-up-and-coming bands like Korn, who reciprocally became the inspiration behind the nu metal style of the band's next album Roots (1996). Roots would influence a generation of bands from Linkin Park to Slipknot, which during the 1990s meant the replacement of death, thrash, and speed, by nu metal and metalcore as popular epicenters of the hardest metal scene.

Staying away from this new commercial mainstream of groove metal, metalcore, and especially nu metal, the second wave of black metal emerged as an opposed underground music scene, initially in Norway. This crop of new bands differenced themselves from the "first wave" by totally distilling black metal from the combined origins with thrash metal, but they preserved from all these sub-genres the emphasis on atmosphere over rhythm.

As further extreme metal genres came to prominence in the 1990s (industrial metal, death metal, and black metal each finding their own fanbase), the heavy metal "family tree" soon found itself blending aesthetics and styles. For example, bands with all the musical traits of thrash metal began using death growls, a vocal style borrowed from death metal, while black metal bands often utilized the airy feel of synthesizers, popularized in industrial metal. Today the placing of bands within distinct sub-genres remains a source of contention for heavy metal fans, however, little debate resides over the fact that thrash metal is the sole proprietor of its respective spin-offs.

2000s and 2010s
Many 1980s-era thrash bands who split or were inactive during the 1990s – such as Dark Angel, Death Angel, Nuclear Assault, and Forbidden – reunited in the 2000s. Notable bands returned to their roots with releases such as Kreator's Violent Revolution (2001), Metallica's Death Magnetic (2008), Megadeth's Endgame (2009), Slayer's World Painted Blood (2009), Exodus' Exhibit B: The Human Condition (2010), Overkill's Ironbound (2010), Anthrax's Worship Music (2011), Testament's Dark Roots of Earth (2012), and Flotsam and Jetsam's Ugly Noise (2012). More recent bands of the genre, such as Havok and Legion of the Damned have turned their focus towards a more aggressive rendition of thrash metal, incorporating elements of melodic death metal.

Spin-off genres
Thrash metal is directly responsible for the development of underground metal genres, such as death metal, black metal, and groove metal. In addition to this, metalcore, grindcore, and deathcore employ similar riffs in their composition, the former with more focus on melody rather than chromaticism. The blending of punk ethos and metal's brutal nature led to even more extreme, underground styles after thrash metal began gaining mild commercial success in the late 1980s. With gorier subject matter, heavier down tuning of guitars, more consistent use of blast beat drumming, and darker, atonal death growls, death metal was established in the mid-1980s. Black metal, also related to thrash metal, emerged at the same time, with many black metal bands taking influence from thrash metal bands such as Venom. Black metal continued deviating from thrash metal, often providing more orchestral overtones, open tremolo picking, blast beat drumming, shrieked or raspy vocals and pagan or occult-based aesthetics to distinguish itself from thrash metal. Thrash metal would later combine with its spinoffs, thus giving rise to genres like blackened thrash metal and deathrash.

Groove metal

Groove metal takes the intensity and sonic qualities of thrash metal and plays them at mid-tempo, with most bands making only occasional forays into fast tempo, but since the early 1990s, it started to favor a more death metal–derived sound. Thrash metal with stronger punk elements is called crossover thrash. Its overall sound is more punk-influenced than traditional thrash metal but has more heavy metal elements than hardcore punk and thrashcore.

Regional scenes

Thrash metal emerged predominantly from a handful of regional scenes, each of which was generally distinguished by the unique characteristics of its bands.

 Bay Area thrash metal, also known as West Coast thrash metal: In addition to being the most commercially successful, the West Coast's thrash metal, as well as the Northwest and Southwest regions (including California, Washington and Arizona), tended to be the most progressive and technical of the major regional thrash scenes, being strongly NWOBHM influenced. Metallica, Megadeth, Slayer, Testament, Exodus, Metal Church, Dark Angel, Sacred Reich, Suicidal Tendencies, Possessed, Deliverance, Death Angel, Attitude Adjustment, Lȧȧz Rockit, Vio-lence, Forbidden, Flotsam and Jetsam, Defiance, Sadus and Hirax are prominent examples of bands to emerge from this region. Although half of the aforementioned bands (specifically including Metallica, Megadeth, Slayer, Dark Angel and Suicidal Tendencies) were technically not from the Bay Area, they are often credited for popularizing and contributing to the thrash metal scene in Northern California during the 1980s by frequently playing shows there, especially early in their careers and/or before they received their first record deal.
 East Coast thrash metal: Centered in New York City, the East Coast's thrash metal tended to display a sound that incorporated a strong hardcore punk influence. An emphasis was placed on aggression and speed rather than technicality. Anthrax, Overkill, Carnivore, Nuclear Assault, Meanstreak, Warzone, Prong, Toxik, Whiplash, Wrathchild America exemplified the style to emerge from this regional scene.
Gulf Coast thrash metal: While not as popular as the West Coast and East Coast regions, the Gulf Coast spawned at least three thrash metal scenes (including Texas, Louisiana and Florida) during the late 1980s and early 1990s, which saw a number of bands develop a style that was influenced by punk rock and/or the early-to-mid 1980s heavy metal scene. The most notable bands from the Gulf Coast are Atheist, Solstice, Juggernaut, Opprobrium (formerly called Incubus), Watchtower, Rigor Mortis, D.R.I., Absu, Nasty Savage, Verbal Abuse, Angkor Wat, Dead Horse, Pantera and Exhorder, the latter of the two (along with New York's Prong) are often credited for developing and popularizing the groove metal genre in the early 1990s.
 British thrash metal: It all started when NWOBHM bands like Raven, Jaguar, Warfare and Dragonslayer (who were originally called Slayer) started playing accelerated heavy metal. This led to British thrash metal bands leaning towards a more traditional heavy metal approach, often heavier though less aggressive than their American counterparts. Also, crust punk is an integral part of the British thrash metal scene. The most notable bands from this scene are Onslaught, Cancer, Amebix, Sabbat, Detritus, Xentrix, Sacrilege, Nightlord, Atomkraft, Hellbastard, Cerebral Fix, Seventh Angel, Acid Reign and Lawnmower Deth. 
 Brazilian thrash metal: The Brazilian thrash scene is notable for producing a handful of bands that would become principal parts of thrash metal's prevalence in the early 1990s. There were three scenes where Brazilian thrash metal originated: Belo Horizonte (the most prominent), São Paulo, and Rio de Janeiro. The most notable bands from this scene are Sepultura, Dorsal Atlântica, Executer, Mutilator, Chakal, Korzus, Holocausto, Claustrofobia, Torture Squad, Ratos de Porão, Sagrado Inferno, Vulcano and Sarcófago.
 Teutonic thrash metal: The German and Swiss regions have spawned dozens of bands since the mid-1980s that developed their own style. Their style was more aggressive than American and Canadian thrash. The most prominent bands from this scene are Kreator, Destruction, Sodom, Tankard, Celtic Frost, Holy Moses, Desaster, Coroner, Exumer, Despair, Paradox, Messiah, Assassin, Poltergeist, Living Death and Sieges Even. (who were originally called Sodom)
 Canadian thrash metal: The Canadian region has seen numerous thrash metal bands create a unique blend of speed metal, progressive and hardcore punk into their music, influenced by a variety of acts such as Rush, Iron Maiden, Judas Priest, Motörhead and D.R.I., as well as fellow American thrash metal bands like Metallica and Slayer. Anvil and Exciter are considered to be the pioneers of this scene, while Voivod, Sacrifice, Razor, and Annihilator are often referred to as the country's "Big Four". Other notable Canadian thrash metal bands include Infernäl Mäjesty, Anonymus, Eudoxis, Piledriver, Slaughter, DBC and Obliveon.
 Australian thrash metal: While not considered a "major" part of the worldwide thrash metal scene due to distance from the major Bay Area and Teutonic scenes, Australian thrash metal has had a fairly substantial following in overseas markets, while local audiences have always been difficult to gather. The most notable Australian thrash metal bands from the 1980s are Mortal Sin, Nothing Sacred and Hobbs' Angel of Death.

See also
List of thrash metal bands

Notes

Bibliography

 
1980s in music
1990s in music
2000s in music
20th-century music genres
American rock music genres
American styles of music
British rock music genres
British styles of music
Extreme metal
Heavy metal genres
Reagan Era